Huajiachi is a lake in Hangzhou, Zhejiang.

Introduction

The lake is located in the Huajiachi Campus, Zhejiang University. It is the second largest lake in Hangzhou after the West Lake. Along the lake there is a Chinese pavilion named Huxin Ting. The lake has a water surface of more than 90 mu (over 55,000 m2) and an average depth of 2 meters.

Hua is a common Chinese surname, and jia means family in Chinese; so Huajia implies that this place probably belonged to the Hua Family in the ancient time. Chi stands for lake. And the Zhejiang University campus is just named after this lake.

About six-hundred years ago, it was wasteland nearby, and a highly ranked official Mr. Hua during Ming Dynasty Hongwu Era (1368-1398) once passed-by and first settled down there, opened the wasteland.

References

Huajiachi Campus, Zhejiang University
Lakes of Zhejiang
Geography of Hangzhou